Bahía Todos Santos, or Bay of All Saints, is a sheltered bay in Ensenada, Baja California, Mexico. The bay is home to the deepwater busy international Port of Ensenada.

Geography
The bay bound to the north and east by the Pacific coast of the Baja California Peninsula, and to the south by Cape Punta Banda.

Flora and fauna
The bay serves as a temporary resting stop for the migrating gray whale, who occasionally give birth offshore, though it is much more common for birthing to occur in the lagoons of the west coast of Baja California.

Recreation
The bay is home to several marinas within Ensenada including Ensenada Cruiseport Village, Marina Coral & Hotel, Punta Morro Resort, and Bajamar Oceanfront Golf Resort.

See also
 Isla Todos Santos

References

 

Bays of Mexico on the Pacific Ocean
Bays of Ensenada Municipality